This is a list of episodes of the fifteenth season of The Ellen DeGeneres Show (often stylized as ellen15), which began airing from Tuesday, September 5, 2017.

Episodes

References

External links
 

15
2017 American television seasons
2018 American television seasons